Sakon Nakhon Hospital is the main hospital of Sakon Nakhon Province, Thailand. It is classified under the Ministry of Public Health as a regional hospital.

History 
On 24 June 1953, Sakon Nakhon Hospital was opened in the area of Wat Sa Kaeo, next to Nong Han Lake. Over the years, it has seen significant development especially from the contributions of the revered local monks Fan Acharo and Baen Thanagro. It is currently a regional hospital with a capacity of 909 inpatient beds as of 2022.

See also 

 Healthcare in Thailand
 Hospitals in Thailand
 List of hospitals in Thailand

References 

Hospitals in Thailand
Sakon Nakhon province